Margaret Laurence is an Australian actress, best known for several soap opera roles.

She trained in Britain, and then worked in America on stage and in several daytime soap operas.

When she moved to Australia, her first high-profile role was in Number 96 as Liz Chalmers for six months from late 1975 to early 1976. Sweet Liz became key character Arnold Feather's second wife, but was ultimately revealed as a deceitful schemer who tried to poison Arnold.

She followed this by playing Marilyn Mason in the television series Prisoner. Laurence was one of the programme's original cast in 1979, but appeared in only the first 16 episodes – the original planned duration of the series. After she left the show she returned to America where she did a lot of promotional work for the show. She stated she did not like the role, and being compared to Farrah Fawcett and Bridgette Bardot, although co-star Val Lehman, said the role should not reflect the quality of the series

She also played troublesome nurse Yvonne Davies in The Young Doctors in 1979.

Her ex-husband is American-born actor Brandon Smith, who had short-term roles in both Number 96 and Prisoner; in the case of Prisoner, appearing in some scenes with Laurence. They have a daughter, Camille.

FILMOGRAPHY

FILM

TELEVISION

References

External links
 

Australian soap opera actresses
Living people
1950 births
20th-century Australian actresses
21st-century Australian women
21st-century Australian people